The Battle of Varja took place on November 7, 1700 close to at the villages of Varja and Aa, in the Duchy of Estonia of the Swedish Empire during the Estonian campaign of the first year in the Great Northern War.

Prelude 
A Swedish force consisting of 800 men under the command of generals Georg Reinhold von Patkul and Hans Henrik von Tiesenhausen were sent out from Rakvere to secure the road at which the main army under Charles XII of Sweden were going in order to relief the city of Narva which had been besieged by the Russians for a while.

Battle 
At the villages of Varja and Aa they surprised a Russian force of 2,000 men from Boris Sheremetev's detachment gathering supplies for their army at Narva. The Russians were caught completely off guard and subsequently took cover within the houses to avoid the Swedish onslaught, these were however, soon put on fire by the Swedes, an action resulting in 1,500 Russians killed, wounded or captured to about 200 Swedes with only 500 Russians who managed to escape. Later during the day, as the Swedes were looting the Russian supplies, a larger force of 3,000 men under Sheremetev himself, arrived and in turn surprised the Swedes who were driven off with a loss of 80 men among them, the Swedish commander Georg Reinhold Patkul who was captured during the retreat.

Aftermath 
The Russians here received important information about the approach of the Swedish main army under Charles, who arrived at the two villages about two weeks later. Sheremetev would later face the Swedish vanguard at Pühhajoggi, however after initial skirmishes he was soon driven off leading to the battle of Narva where the Russian main army saw itself decisively defeated by the Swedish army.

References

Varja
1700 in Europe
Varja
Varja
Varja
Varja
18th century in Estonia